Santo Niño is an administrative division in southern Metro Manila, the Philippines. It is a barangay in the city of Parañaque immediately surrounding Ninoy Aquino International Airport on its west and south sides. A large portion of the village extends into the property of the airport grounds to include Terminal 1 as well as the western half of Runway 06/24. Its population is concentrated in the areas along the Estero de Tripa de Gallina.

Across the Tripa de Gallina to the west are the villages of Tambo and Don Galo. To the south, it also shares borders with La Huerta along the Parañaque River, and with Moonwalk along the Ibayo Creek (Cañales Creek). Its northern borders are Vitalez, a small extension of Tambo, and the Pasay district of Maricaban including Barangay 183 (Villamor Air Base). As of the 2015 census, it had a population of 34,860.

As an "airport village," Santo Niño is a hub for aviation logistics and tourism, serving as the main base of operations for companies such as AAI Group, the Duty Free Philippines, Royal Cargo, and a branch of SPI Global. Retail stores line much of the area of Ninoy Aquino Avenue in the village's southern portion, including the Duty Free Fiesta Mall and S&R.

History

Santo Niño was originally known as Ibayo, an old Tagalog word which means "the opposite side of the river," referring to the village's location across the Estero de Tripa de Gallina and Parañaque River from the populated coastal barrios of Parañaque. It was established as a sitio of Don Galo by the late 17th century, connected to it only by a bamboo footbridge over the Tripa de Gallina. The sitio remained largely agricultural during the Spanish colonial period containing vast tracts of farmland and swamps that stretched as far north as the Estero de Maricaban and east to the territories of Malibay (now part of Pasay) and Bicutan (now part of Taguig), forming parts of the  Hacienda de Maricaban of the Order of Saint Augustine. The sitio's original settlers were migrants from Don Galo, La Huerta and San Dionisio, including its pioneers, the de León family, followed by the Márquez, Santos, Valenzuela and Cruz families. With the incorporation of Parañaque as a town in the Province of Rizal under the American colonial government, Ibayo became a full-fledged barrio and Parañaque's only inland barrio consisting of four sitios, namely Dilain, Libro Balagbag, Bundok Mani and Mataas na Kahoy.

Under American rule, the village started to grow with the purchase of the Hacienda de Maricaban by the U.S. government from its owner Dolores Casal y Ochoa who only years earlier in 1906 acquired the former friar hacienda. A portion of the hacienda was then transferred to the Manila Railroad Company and a railroad line was eventually extended to this barrio towards Cavite, with another line in its eastern portion towards Aloneros and the Bicol Region. In 1919, the Parañaque and Pasay section of the Maricaban estate was transformed into a U.S. Army Air Service camp known as Nichols Field, with the rest of the estate becoming part of the Fort William McKinley reservation. The airfield was eventually converted into an airport in 1948 and became Manila International Airport.

Ibayo was officially renamed after the barrio's patron saint, the Santo Niño de Parañaque, in 1960. In 1978, the barrio lost a significant part of its interior territory after two new barangays were created from several gated communities that were built there after the war. The communities adjacent to Bicutan, namely United Parañaque 1–3, Marian Park and Sitio de Asis, were ceded to the new barangay of San Martin de Porres. Its southern communities, on the other hand, became part of the barangay of Moonwalk that included Moonwalk Subdivision, Bricktown and Multinational Village. The parish church of Santo Niño was created in 1995.

Education

Santo Niño is home to the following educational institutions:

 Parañaque National High School (Santo Niño Annex)
 Parañaque Science High School
 Polytechnic University of the Philippines Parañaque Campus
 Santo Niño Elementary School

Transportation

The main street in this village is Ninoy Aquino Avenue, a national secondary road which runs north–south connecting NAIA Road and Dr. Santos Avenue near the southern perimeter of Ninoy Aquino International Airport. It is connected to the C-5 Road network via Multinational Avenue which runs along Ibayo Creek and to the South Luzon Expressway via Kaingin Road. This area in the southern edges of Santo Niño in close proximity to the main airport runway is home to several other freight and logistics businesses, as well as shanties along the creek which in 2010 was home to 150 informal settler families. The main residential area is crossed by Col. De Leon Street in the west which runs parallel to and midway between the Ninoy Aquino Avenue and the Estero de Tripa de Gallina. Its main east–west corridor is Pascor Drive in the north which traverses the area that formerly housed the  PAGCOR Casino Filipino Airport complex which closed down in 2014 and which was bought by SM Prime Holdings in 2018. In the south, the village is crossed by J.P. Rizal Street which links the Ninoy Aquino Avenue to the bridge over the Tripa de Gallina to Don Galo. This street is home to the Santo Niño Parish Church and Santo Niño Barangay Hall, as well as the Ibayo Town Center. The C-5 South Link Expressway will run along its southern limits parallel to the existing C-5 Road.

References

Barangays of Metro Manila
Parañaque